Heis may refer to:

Heis (town), a town in Sanaag, Somaliland
Heis (crater), a lunar impact crater

People with the surname
Eduard Heis (1806–1877), German mathematician and astronomer